CTERA Networks is a privately held enterprise software company headquartered in New York and Israel. The company has regional offices in the UK, Italy, France, Spain, Germany, and Australia.  , the company is designated as the leading vendor in distributed cloud file storage by GigaOm.

CTERA has partnered with companies including Amazon Web Services, Hewlett Packard Enterprise, IBM, and Cisco. Clients include Deutsche Telekom, Banco Santander, Axa and the United States Department of Defense. In October 2016 IBM became a CTERA reseller. IBM's Cloud Object Storage, integrated with the CTERA Enterprise File Services Platform, can be deployed on-premises, in the cloud or in a hybrid on-premises/cloud setup.

History
CTERA was founded in 2008 by Liran Eshel and Zohar Kaufman.

, CTERA has raised $100 million in funding from investors including Benchmark Capital, Venrock, Cisco Systems, Bessemer Venture Partners and Vintage Investment Partners.  

Gartner named CTERA one of five Cool Venders in Storage Technologies in 2013 and it was included on the Deloitte Fast 500 list in technology in 2015. 

In June 2016, CTERA earned a contract to provide a private cloud file sharing solution to the United States Department of Defense. As part of the agreement, CTERA and DISA (Defense Information Systems Agency) co-developed a mutual authentication technology using government-issued smart cards for additional layers of protection beyond the standard enterprise integration with Microsoft Active Directory servers.

In 2021, GigaOm has evaluated distributed cloud file storage suppliers and designated CTERA as the leading vendor and outperformer.

Products

In 2009, CTERA released its first cloud storage gateway, the C200. The gateway combined the speed of local network storage with off-site cloud storage and backup technology. In 2010, CTERA released the C400 cloud storage gateway which added features for office server backup and recovery and collaboration capability for multiple users working on files stored in the cloud or on the gateway. In 2011, the C800 gateway was released with 24 TB of raw local storage. In 2016, CTERA announced a virtual cloud storage gateway that can be deployed from VMware or KVM servers that enabled customers to use existing hardware. CTERA released updates to its cloud storage gateway portfolio in April 2016 focused on efficiency and storage capacity.

CTERA released Enterprise File Sync and Share (EFSS) in 2012, which enabled users to access, share and collaborate on files from any location by storing files either locally or on the cloud. Also in 2012, CTERA launched a mobile app which made it possible to access files and backups on iOS and Android devices.

In December 2015, CTERA announced Cloud Server Data Protection, its storage-as-a-service server data protection software for enterprise CloudOps. Cloud Server Data Protection protects server data on a private or virtual private cloud using backup agents for Windows and Linux environments and object storage services through cloud platforms such as Amazon Web Services, Microsoft Azure, IBM Cloud and OpenStack-based clouds.

See also
Science and technology in Israel
Hybrid cloud storage
Cloud storage
File sharing
File synchronization

References

Cloud storage
Online backup services
Data protection
Data synchronization
Network-attached storage
Computer hardware companies
Cloud storage gateways
Software companies of the United States